Scrooge is a 1970 musical film adaptation of Charles Dickens' 1843 story A Christmas Carol. It was filmed in London between January and May 1970 and directed by Ronald Neame, and starred Albert Finney as Ebenezer Scrooge. The film's score was composed by Leslie Bricusse and arranged and conducted by Ian Fraser. With eleven musical arrangements interspersed throughout, the award-winning motion picture is a faithful musical retelling of the original.

The film was a follow-up to another Dickens musical adaptation, 1968's award-winning Oliver!. The posters for Scrooge included the tagline, "What the dickens have they done to Scrooge?" designed to head off any criticism of an all-singing, all-dancing old skinflint. Finney won the Golden Globe Award for Best Actor in a Musical/Comedy in 1971. The film received four Academy Award nominations, including for Best Original Song for "Thank You Very Much".

Plot 

On Christmas Eve 1860, in London, Ebenezer Scrooge, a surly money-lender, does not share the merriment of Christmas. He declines his nephew Harry's invitation for Christmas dinner and reluctantly gives his loyal employee Bob Cratchit Christmas Day off. Cratchit and his children go shopping and prepare for the holiday at home ("Christmas Children"). As Scrooge leaves his office, he declines two gentlemen's offer to collect money for charity and visits some of his clients including Tom Jenkins ("I Hate People"). As he makes his way home, he is accosted and mocked by street urchins ("Father Christmas").

In his house, Scrooge encounters the ghost of his seven-year-dead business partner Jacob Marley, who warns him to repent his wicked ways or he will be condemned in the afterlife as he was, carrying a heavy chain forged by his own selfishness and greed ("See the Phantoms"). Before leaving, Marley informs him that three spirits will visit him.

At one o'clock, Scrooge is visited by the Victorian Ghost of Christmas Past, who takes him back in time to his childhood and early adult life.  They visit his lonely school days, where he is taken back home by his beloved sister, Fan, and then his time as an employee under Mr. Fezziwig. At a Christmas party held by Fezziwig ("December the 25th"), Scrooge falls in love with Fezziwig's daughter, Isabel ("Happiness"). However, the spirit shows Scrooge how Isabel left him when he chose money over her ("You..."). He dismisses the spirit as he finds himself back in his bed.

At two o'clock, Scrooge is visited by the Ghost of Christmas Present, a jolly giant who teaches him the joys and wonder of Christmas Day ("I Like Life"). Scrooge and the spirit visit Bob's house, learning his family is surprisingly content with their small dinner, while Scrooge takes pity on Bob's ill son Tiny Tim. The spirit hints that Tiny Tim might die unless the course of events changes. They next visit Harry's Christmas party, where Harry defends his uncle from his guests' snide remarks. Before the spirit vanishes, Scrooge is warned that life is short and to do as much as he can in what time he has. He finds himself back in his bed.

At three o'clock, Scrooge is visited by the Ghost of Christmas Yet to Come, a silent, cloaked figure who shows him the future of Christmas 1861 with Tom and the other citizens rejoicing at the death of Scrooge ("Thank You Very Much"), with Scrooge unaware of the reason they are celebrating. The spirit points Scrooge to Bob's house, and he sees his family in mourning and Tiny Tim and Bob are absent. Enquiring for clarification, Scrooge is taken to a cemetery, where he sees Bob mourning at Tim's grave. The ghost then points out Scrooge's own grave. A horrified Scrooge promises to change his ways as the spirit reveals its Grim Reaper-esque visage and causes him to fall through his grave into the caverns of Hell. Scrooge is met there once again by Marley, who shows him to his ice-cold "office" to serve as Lucifer's personal clerk. Scrooge is adorned with an enormous chain made from his lifetime of past sins by four masked demons before finding himself back in his bedroom.

A gleeful Scrooge decides to bring happiness to the citizens of London ("I'll Begin Again"). Finding it's Christmas Day, he goes on a shopping spree, buying food and presents. He runs into Harry and his wife and gives them some overdue presents as well. They invite Scrooge to Christmas lunch, which he gladly accepts. Dressed as "Father Christmas," Scrooge then delivers a giant turkey, presents and toys to the Cratchits, and after making his identity known, gives Bob a raise and promises that they will work to find the best doctors to make Tiny Tim better. Scrooge then frees all his clients from their debts, much to their delight and donates a sizable amount of money to the gentlemen he earlier spurned ("Thank You Very Much (Reprise)"). Scrooge returns home to get ready for lunch with his family and thanks Marley for helping him at a second chance at life.

Cast

 Albert Finney as Ebenezer Scrooge
 Alec Guinness as Jacob Marley
 Edith Evans as Ghost of Christmas Past
 Kenneth More as Ghost of Christmas Present
 Paddy Stone as Ghost of Christmas Yet to Come
 David Collings as Bob Cratchit
 Frances Cuka as Mrs. Cratchit
 Richard Beaumont as Tiny Tim
 Michael Medwin as Harry, Scrooge's nephew 
 Mary Peach as Harry's wife
 Gordon Jackson as Tom, Harry's friend
 Anton Rodgers as Tom Jenkins
 Laurence Naismith as Mr. Fezziwig
 Kay Walsh as Mrs. Fezziwig
 Suzanne Neve as Isabel
 Derek Francis as charity gentleman
 Roy Kinnear as charity gentleman
 Geoffrey Bayldon as Pringle, the toyshop owner
 Molly Weir as woman debtor
 Helena Gloag as woman debtor
 Reg Lever as Miller, the puppeteer
 Karen Scargill as Kathy Cratchit
 Keith Marsh as well wisher
 Marianne Stone as party guest

Soundtrack listing
 "Overture" (removed from current Blu-ray release)
 "A Christmas Carol" – Chorus
 "Christmas Children" – David Collings, Richard Beaumont, & Karen Scargill
 "I Hate People" – Albert Finney
 "Father Christmas" – Urchins
 "See the Phantoms" – Alec Guinness
 "December the 25th" – Laurence Naismith, Kay Walsh & Ensemble
 "Happiness" – Suzanne Neve
 "A Christmas Carol" (Reprise) – Chorus
 "You....You" – Albert Finney
 "I Like Life" – Kenneth More & Albert Finney
 "The Beautiful Day" – Richard Beaumont
 "Happiness" (Reprise)
 "Thank You Very Much" – Anton Rodgers & Ensemble
 "I'll Begin Again" – Albert Finney
 "I Like Life" (Reprise) – Albert Finney
 "Finale: Father Christmas" (Reprise) / "Thank You Very Much" (Reprise) – All
 "Exit Music" (Bonus Track, not included on LP)

A soundtrack album containing all the songs from the film was issued on Columbia Records in 1970. The album peaked at #29 on Billboard'''s Best Best For Christmas album chart on December 19, 1970.  Due to legal complications, however, the soundtrack has never been re-released in the CD format. The current Paramount Blu-ray release of the film has removed the Overture (intact on all VHS and DVD releases).

Title sequence
The film features an opening title sequence of numerous hand-painted backgrounds and overlays by British illustrator Ronald Searle. Art of the Title described it, saying, "As is often the case with Searle’s illustrations, the forms jump and squiggle into shape, the strokes loose and sprightly. In each scene, swaths of colour and life pour out, white snowflakes dotting the brush strokes." The illustrations later appeared in a book, Scrooge, by Elaine Donaldson and published in 1970 by Cinema Center Films.

Production
Filmed in London and on location in Buckinghamshire between January and May 1970, the film sets at Shepperton Studios included fully reconstructed Victorian streets.

Reception
Box officeScrooge opened on two screens in Los Angeles and Chicago, grossing $36,000 in its opening week. It earned $3 million in distributor rentals in the United States and Canada.

Critical reaction
Gene Siskel of The Chicago Tribune awarded the film three-and-a-half stars out of four praising Finney's "masterful performance". Arthur D. Murphy, reviewing for Variety, favorably wrote the film was "a most delightful film in every way," in which he praised Finney as "remarkable" and Bricusse's "unobtrusive complementary music and lyrics; Ronald Neame's delicately controlled direction which conveys, but does not force, all the inherent warmth, humor and sentimentality to both younger and audiences". Vincent Canby of The New York Times wrote that Finney's performance was "absurd, sentimental, pretty, never quite as funny as it intends to be, but quite acceptable, if only as a seasonal ritual." Overall, he felt the adaptation was "surprisingly faithful", and complemented Ronald Neame for directing "the movie with all of the delicacy possible after a small story has been turned into a comparatively large, conventional musical. The settings — London streets and interiors, circa 1860 (updated from the original 1843)—are very attractive, somewhat spruced-up variations on the original John Leech illustrations."

Roger Ebert of the Chicago Sun-Times gave the film three stars out of four feeling the film "works very nicely on its intended level and the kids sitting near me seemed to be having a good time." However, he was critical of Bricusse's songs, writing that they "fall so far below the level of good musical comedy that you wish Albert Finney would stop singing them, until you realize he isn't really singing." Charles Champlin of the Los Angeles Times applauded Scrooge as a "lovely movie, one of the few genuinely family-wide attractions of the whole year, calculated to please equally all those who have loved the Dickens work forever, and all those enviable youngsters who are about to discover it for the first time." Reviewing for the New York Daily News, Ann Guarino wrote Scrooge was "bright with humor and moves along at a lively pace in 19th Century settings." She further praised the cast as "excellent," but described Bricusse's songs as being "pleasant, but unfortunately forgettable with the exception of 'Thank You Very Much'".

Pauline Kael, writing in The New Yorker, found Scrooge to be an "innocuous musical version of A Christmas Carol, starring Albert Finney looking glum. The Leslie Bricusse music is so forgettable that your mind flushes it away while you're hearing it." Jay Cocks of Time magazine derided Finney's performance as "drastically disappointing. [He] grumbles and hobbles through his part, employing mannerism instead of nuance." Cocks was also critical of Bricusse's songs, and summarized the film as "a high-budget holiday spectacular, a musical extracted from Dickens' A Christmas Carol that turns out to be a curdled cup of holiday cheer...First frame to last, Scrooge is a mechanical movie made with indifference to every quality but the box office receipts."

Accolades

Stage adaptation
In 1992, a stage musical adapted from the film, featuring the Bricusse/Fraser songs and starring Anthony Newley, was mounted in the UK under the title Scrooge: The Musical. "I Hate People" was re-written as "I Hate Christmas", and a cast recording was released.

The show was revived in 2003 on a tour of the country by British song and dance man Tommy Steele, and he again reprised the role at the London Palladium in 2004 -making him the performer to have done the most shows at the Palladium. In 2007, Shane Ritchie played the part at the Manchester Palace. The musical was revived at London Palladium in October 2012 with Steele reprising the role. It ran till 5 January 2013.

This was staged in Melbourne, Australia, in 1993, starring Keith Michell, Max Gillies, Tony Taylor, William Zappa, Dale Burridge, Emma Raciti, Ross Hannaford, Paul Cheyne, Glenda Walsh.

Animated remake
In December 2022, an animated remake titled Scrooge: A Christmas Carol was released by Netflix. Prior to that, the film had a limited theatrical release in the United States beginning November 18. Produced by Timeless Films (the team behind the Monster Family'' films) and written and directed by Stephen Donnelly, it featured a new book, but included many of Leslie Bricusse's songs from the 1970 film. The film features Luke Evans as the voice of Scrooge, Johnny Flynn as Bob Cratchit, Fra Fee as Harry, Giles Terera as Tom, Olivia Colman as the Ghost of Christmas Past, James Cosmo as Fezziwig, Jessie Buckley as Isabel, Trevor Dion Nicholas as the Ghost of Christmas Present, and Jonathan Pryce as Jacob Marley.

See also 
 List of Christmas films
 List of ghost films
 List of A Christmas Carol adaptations
 Pickwick, a 1963 musical with lyrics by Bricusse, also based on Dickens

References

External links

 
 
 
 
 

1970 films
1970s Christmas films
1970s musical fantasy films
American Christmas films
American musical fantasy films
British Christmas films
British musical fantasy films
Cinema Center Films films
Films based on A Christmas Carol
Films directed by Ronald Neame
Compositions by Leslie Bricusse
Films featuring a Best Musical or Comedy Actor Golden Globe winning performance
Films set in London
Films set in the 1860s
Films set in the Victorian era
Films shot at Shepperton Studios
1970s English-language films
1970s American films
1970s British films